Brother Seán Sammon, F.M.S. (November 26, 1947 – September 9, 2022) was the former Superior General of the Marist Brothers order, a role he held from October 3, 2001 until 2009.

Biography

Brother Seán's parents were immigrants to the United States, his father from Ireland, his mother from England. He attended the Marist-run St. Agnes Boys High School, and continued on to the juniorate in Cold Spring-on-Hudson, New York. His novitiate was made in Tyngsborough, Massachusetts and in 1967 he pronounced his first vows.

Education
In 1970 Brother Seán graduated from Marist College in Poughkeepsie. He taught at his alma mater while studying at The New School where he earned a Master's degree in 1973. In 1982 he received a doctorate in clinical psychology from Fordham University. In 1978 he was invited to be a staff member at the House of Affirmation, a renewal and rehabilitation center in Massachusetts, and was named its International Clinical Director in 1982, a position he held until 1987. At the present time, he is a licensed psychologist in the State of New York and a member of the National Register of Health Care Providers.

Books

He has published 10 books and multiple articles on topics of religious life and psychology. He was named provincial of the Poughkeepsie Province in 1987 and was elected president of the Conference of Major Superiors of Men Religious of the US. He has been Vicar General of the Marist Brothers since 1993. He was elected Superior General of the Marist Brothers on October 3, 2001, a position he held until 2009. After returning back to the United States, Brother Seán was appointed the Scholar in Residence at Marist College in Poughkeepsie, NY.

Honors

In 2009 he received the title of Doctor honoris causa, from the Catholic Pontifical University of Paraná, Brazil.

See also
 Charles Howard

References 

Marist Brothers
Marist College alumni
Marist College faculty
Living people
People from Manhattan
1947 births